The Youngstown Radio Reading Service (YRRS) is a radio reading service located in Youngstown, Ohio, providing daily readings of a wide variety of topical printed materials to blind and vision-impaired people. YRRS is based at 2747 Belmont Avenue at the Goodwill Industries building in Youngstown. It is a member of Ohio Radio Reading Services, an organization of nine radio reading services throughout Ohio. A volunteer-driven operation, YRRS operates everyday from noon to 11:40 p.m.

Reception of YRRS requires a special radio receiver tuned to WYSU 88.5 FM; the receiver is provided at no cost to its vision-impaired listeners. YRRS operates with the use of WYSU's radio subcarrier.

Funding
Monetary support for the YRRS and other radio reading services comes from the United Way, state and municipal funding, endowments, grants, corporate gifts, community service organizations, fund-raising events and listener contributions.

References

External links
 Ohio Radio Reading Services Home Page
 Youngstown Radio Reading Service

Radio reading services of the United States